SystemRescue (Previously known as "SystemRescueCD") is a Linux distribution for x86 64 and x86 computers. The primary purpose of SystemRescue is to repair unbootable or otherwise damaged computer systems after a system crash. SystemRescue is not intended to be used as a permanent operating system. It runs from a Live CD, a USB flash drive or any type of hard drive. It was designed by a team led by François Dupoux, and is based on Arch Linux since version 6.0. Starting with version 6.0, it has systemd as its init system.

Features
SystemRescue is capable of graphics using the Linux framebuffer option for tools such as GParted. It has options such as connecting to the Internet through an ADSL modem or Ethernet and graphical web browsers such as Mozilla Firefox.

SystemRescue features include:
 GNU Parted and GParted to partition disks and resize partitions, including FAT32 and NTFS
 fdisk to edit the disk partition table
 PartImage - disk imaging software which copies only used sectors
 TestDisk - to recover lost partition and PhotoRec to recover lost data
 smartmontools - a S.M.A.R.T. suite for HDD health reporting and data loss prevention
 ddrescue - to extract recoverable data from physically damaged HDD and listing damaged sectors
 FSArchiver - a system tool that allows you to save the contents of a file-system to a compressed archive file
 nwipe - a secure data erasure tool (fork of DBAN) for harddrives to remove data remanence, supports Gutmann method plus other overwriting standard algorithms and patterns.
 A CD and DVD burner - dvd+rw-tools
 Two bootloaders - GRUB and SYSLINUX
 Web browsers - Firefox, ELinks
 File manager - emelFM2
 Archiving and unarchiving abilities
 File system tools - file system create, delete, resize, move
 Support for many file systems, including full NTFS read/write access (via NTFS-3G) as well as FAT32 and Mac OS HFS
 Support for Intel x86 and PowerPC systems, including Macs
 Ability to create a boot disk for operating systems
 Support for Windows Registry editing and password changing from Linux
 Can boot FreeDOS, Memtest86+, hardware diagnostics and other boot disks from a single CD

Burning DVDs and system backup
The CD can also boot from a customized DVD which has almost 4.6 GB of free space for backed-up files. This makes it good for storing all the information that is needed from a hard drive and then formatting it. To burn the DVD, one must burn the image file first and then add all the separate files and folders. This should not affect the general way in which the DVD works. The DVD can then be used to insert those files into the hard drive using Midnight Commander.

See also

 Parted Magic
 List of bootable data recovery software

References

External links
 
 
 

Arch-based Linux distributions
Free data recovery software
Free security software
Linux distributions
Live USB
Operating system distributions bootable from read-only media